Kinoplex was a multiplex cinema operator in Poland.

It operated six multiplex cinemas.

Current locations
Gdańsk - 1720 seats, 8 screens
Kielce - 1614 seats, 7 screens
Bielsko-Biała - 1587 seats, 7 screens
Opole - 1245 seats, 6 screens
Warszawa - 547 seats, 4 screens
Gorzów Wielkopolski - 1200 seats, 5 screens

Traditional cinemas
Alongside multiplex facilities Kinoplex operates one traditional cinema in Białystok - Kino "Pokój" (eng. Peace).

External links 
 Official Website

Cinema chains in Poland
Entertainment companies established in 1995